Frogcircus is a rock band from Berlin, Germany, originally formed in Las Palmas de Gran Canaria, Spain in 1996.

History 

Frogcircus was founded in 1996 by singer/guitarist Stone (born Antonio Alonso) in Las Palmas de Gran Canaria, Spain. After the split of previous bands like Luger and Vicious Soul, Stone recruited bassist Mariano Gracia and drummer Juan Manuel Cuadrado and recorded the first band demos "Drunken Sailors' Ritual" (1996) and "The Chinese Sideburns" (1997).

In 1998, guitarist Jorge Casañas and drummer José Llobet entered the band, and 1999 saw the release of the first album Acid Jokes on Ajo Records under the production of Jorge Casañas and Frogcircus. That year, the band appeared at a special feature show on United States-Television channel HBO to premiere the record, and also headlined the Campus Rock Festival together with Spanish rockers Dover, as well as appearances with Nada Surf, The Godfathers and Mick Taylor.

Right after the incorporation of drummer Miguel Arencibia and bassist Miguel Ballesteros, the band moved to Berlin, where they signed with indie label Thorshammer and released the Zeitgeist EP (2002). The EP, produced by Thomas Neumann, brought the band to its first German tour together with singer-songwriter Bobo (who had previously worked with Rammstein on their hit single "Engel"). After the recording of the Zeitgeist EP, the band again changed the Spanish musicians for local ones, and drummer Tyronne Silva and bassist Timo Günzel joined Stone, by now the only original founding member in the band.

The band worked as a trio on what would become their next album, recorded in Berlin and Gran Canaria, with Stone acting as producer this time under his real name. Shortly after, Tyronne Silva had to quit drumming for a longer period due to health reasons, and after some provisional drummers filling the spot, Tobi Fröhlich (previously in Limbic) joined the band in 2004.

The second LP Allergic was released on 1 March 2005 under Soja Music, together with the single "Titanium" and the video. The band wrote two new songs for the film "Ludgers Fall" by director Wolf Wolff and the theme song for Sebastian Pannek's "The Assessment". During August 2006, the band recorded what would be the third full album Not Completely Clean, produced by Jürgen Block, released in July 2008 under BlackRock Records.

The fourth album, titled Ink, was recorded between December 2009 and March 2010 in Berlin and was released in December 2010 under BlackRock Records again. Production duties were taken by Antonio Alonso and Gonzalo Ramos.

Discography

Albums 
 Acid Jokes (1999)
 Allergic (2005)
 Not Completely Clean (2008)
 Ink (2010)

EPs 
 Zeitgeist EP (2002)

Singles 
 "An Ocean Apart" / "Minutes on the Wall" (1999)
 "The World's in B&W" / "Why Cow?" (2002)
 "Titanium" (2005)
 "Off the Tide" / "Sometimes" (Ludgers Fall soundtrack) (2006)

External links 
Official Homepage

German musical groups
Musical groups from Berlin